Look E-San Football Club (Thai สโมสรฟุตบอลลูกอีสาน) is a Thai football club based in Nakhon Ratchasima Province. The club currently plays in the Thai League 4 Western Region.

In 2012 the club signed an agreement with Police United to become their feeder club using several of their youth players. The team also moved to play home games at the Bunyajinda Stadium in Bangkok.

In 2016, the club signed an agreement with Look E-San after break team in 2015. The team also moved to play home games at Phutianan 2 Sport club in Sukhumvit, Bangkok.

Stadium and locations

Seasons

Honours

Domestic Leagues
Regional League Central-East Division
 Winner (1) : 2013

External links 
 Official Website
 Facebookpage

Football clubs in Thailand
Sport in Chonburi province
Association football clubs established in 2002
2002 establishments in Thailand